Mafalda is a comune (municipality) in the Province of Campobasso in the Italian region Molise, located about  north of Campobasso.

Mafalda borders the following municipalities: Dogliola, Fresagrandinaria, Lentella, Montenero di Bisaccia, San Felice del Molise, Tavenna, Tufillo.

See also
 Molise Croats

References

External links
 Official website

Cities and towns in Molise